Haltemprice Priory was an Augustinian monastery approximately two miles south of the village of Cottingham in the East Riding of Yorkshire, England. The original monastic buildings have long since gone, although ruins of a farmhouse, built in 1584, remain on site and incorporate some of the Priory stonework.

Origins

In 1320 Pope John XXII licensed Thomas Wake, of Liddell in Cumberland (who inherited the manor of Cottingham in 1300), to found an Augustinian monastery in Cottingham incorporating the church there. Some records suggest that the first Priory was actually built, and that canons of the house of Bourne in the Diocese of Lincoln had taken up residence there when legal complications arose.

It was discovered that, because of certain statutes of English law, Thomas Wake's heirs or successors would have been able to order the future demolition of the Priory. It was for this reason that the Pope granted further licence that the Priory should be moved to another suitable location, so it was with permission from both the Pope and Edward II that Thomas Wake moved the monastery to Newton – a now deserted medieval village two miles south of Cottingham.

History

Foundation
In the foundation charter of 1325, Thomas Wake bestowed the manors of Newton, Willerby and Wolfreton upon Haltemprice
Priory (originally Alta Prisa, from the medieval French Haulte Emprise or "High Endeavour", giving the modern name Haltemprice) with the rent and services of the free tenants and serfs therein.  He also gave half the toll of the market of Cottingham, and of the fairs there, and the advowson of the churches of Cottingham, Kirk Ella, Wharram Percy, and Belton in the Isle of Axholme

Heyday, 1320–1342
During 1320 to 1342, Haltemprice Priory experienced its heyday. At the peak of its influence, the Priory controlled a large swathe of land extending from Willerby to Cottingham, Kirk Ella and Southwood. Despite the personal, political, financial and military problems affecting him– including the capture of his castle at Liddell by King David of Scotland– Thomas Wake continued to bestow gifts upon the priory until 1342 when records of further benefactions cease. Sir Thomas died in 1349 and was interred at the priory.

Decline, 1342–1534
From 1342 to 1534 the Priory's fortunes turned. A combination of mounting debt, administrative incompetence and a string of expensive litigation drained the ecclesiastical finances to the point where Priory could no longer be sustained by the flow of donations it received from its benefactors.

The situation was dire, and at the time of Sir Thomas's death in 1349 the construction of the Priory was still not fully complete. Since then– with the decline in finances– the Priory had fallen into an even worse state of disrepair. In a report issued to Pope John XXIII (Antipope) in 1411 it was revealed that a gale had blown down the bell-tower, ruining the church and other buildings and that a fire had destroyed the Priory gateway and nearby offices. The Priory was in such a bad state of disrepair it afforded poor accommodation for those living there.

From 1415 to 1458 Haltemprice Priory was made exempt from royal taxation on grounds of 'notorious poverty'.

In 1515 a dispute came to pass between John Wymersley, the Prior of Haltemprice, and Edward Mattison, the Sheriff of Hull, over who possessed legal authority over Willerby and Wolfreton. A battle ensued, only to be broken up by the Mayor of Hull, and settled in the Court of Star Chamber– three years later. The final ruling allowed Hull control of the freshwater springs conceding the royalties of Willerby and Wolfreton to the Priory.

Dissolution

During the Dissolution of the Monasteries orchestrated by Henry VIII the house was visited by commissioners Richard Layton and Thomas Legh. On 26 May 1536 they reported that the house was occupied by a prior and nine canons along with forty servants and boys. Haltemprice Priory was finally dissolved on 12 August 1536.

Priors of Haltemprice

Burials
Thomas Wake, 2nd Baron Wake of Liddell

Haltemprice Priory Farm

Haltemprice Priory Farm dates from the 15th to 16th century with late-18th-century alterations. The structure is thought to incorporate stonework from the dissolved priory. The farm was occupied up to 1988; it became derelict, and suffered fire damage in the late 1990s and early 2000s. The building is designated as a Grade II* Listed Building of Special Architectural or Historic Interest and was first listed in 1951. The priory site itself is classified as a Scheduled Monument, first scheduled in 1957. The farm is on the Heritage at Risk Register.

In 2021 and 2022, the farmhouse was extensively rebuilt and refurbished into a private residence. The building standing there today is a mix the original farmhouse brick, and new installations that have been kept in design with the house's history.

See also
List of monastic houses in the East Riding of Yorkshire
List of monastic houses in England

References

Sources

External links

Monasteries in the East Riding of Yorkshire
Augustinian monasteries in England
Grade II* listed buildings in the East Riding of Yorkshire
Ruins in the East Riding of Yorkshire
Structures on the Heritage at Risk register
Cottingham, East Riding of Yorkshire
1326 establishments in England
Christian monasteries established in the 14th century
1536 disestablishments in England
Monasteries dissolved under the English Reformation